The University of San Diego (USD) is a private Roman Catholic research university in San Diego, California. Chartered in July 1949 as the independent San Diego College for Women and San Diego University (comprising the College for Men and School of Law), the two institutions merged in 1972.

Since then, the university has grown to comprise nine undergraduate and graduate schools, to include the Shiley-Marcos School of Engineering, Joan B. Kroc School of Peace Studies, the Hahn School of Nursing and Health Science, the School of Leadership and Education Sciences (SOLES), the Knauss School of Business and the Division of Professional and Continuing Education.

USD has 89 undergraduate and graduate programs, and enrolls approximately 9,073 undergraduate, paralegal, graduate and law students. It is classified among "R2: Doctoral Universities – High research activity".

History 

Charters were granted in 1949 for the San Diego College for Women and San Diego University, which included the College for Men and School of Law. The College for Women opened its doors to its first class of students in 1952. The Most Reverend Charles F. Buddy, D.D., then bishop of the Diocese of San Diego and Reverend Mother Rosalie Hill, RSCJ, a Superior Vicaress of the Society of the Sacred Heart of Jesus, chartered the institution from resources drawn from their respective organizations on a stretch of land known as "Alcalá Park," named for San Diego de Alcalá. In 1954, the College for Men and the School of Law opened. These two schools originally occupied Bogue Hall on the same site of University High School, which would later become the home of the University of San Diego High School.  Starting in 1954, Alcalá Park also served as the diocesan chancery office and housed the episcopal offices, until the diocese moved to a vacated Benedictine convent that was converted to a pastoral center. In 1957, Immaculate Heart Major Seminary and St. Francis Minor Seminary were moved into their newly completed facility, now known as Maher Hall. The Immaculata Chapel, now no longer affiliated with USD, also opened that year as part of the seminary facilities. For nearly two decades, these schools co-existed on Alcalá Park. Immaculate Heart closed at the end of 1968, when its building was renamed De Sales Hall; St. Francis remained open until 1970, when it was transferred to another location on campus, leaving all of the newly named Bishop Leo T. Maher Hall to the newly merged co-educational University of San Diego in 1972. Since then, the university has grown quickly and has been able to increase its assets and academic programs.  The student body, the local community, patrons, alumni, and many organizations have been integral to the university's development.

Significant periods of expansion of the university, since the 1972 merger, occurred in the mid-1980s, as well as in 1998, when Joan B. Kroc, philanthropist and wife of McDonald's financier Ray Kroc, endowed USD with a gift of $25 million for the construction of the Institute for Peace & Justice. Other significant donations to the college came in the form of multimillion-dollar gifts from weight-loss tycoon Jenny Craig, inventor Donald Shiley, investment banker and alumnus Bert Degheri, and an additional gift of $50 million Mrs. Kroc left the School of Peace Studies upon her death. These gifts helped make possible, respectively, the Jenny Craig Pavilion (an athletic arena), the Donald P. Shiley Center for Science and Technology, the Joan B. Kroc School of Peace Studies, and the Degheri Alumni Center.  As a result, USD has been able to host the West Coast Conference (WCC) basketball tournament in 2002, 2003 and 2008, and hosted international functions such as the Kyoto Laureate Symposium at the Joan B. Kroc Institute for Peace & Justice and at USD's Shiley Theatre. Shiley's gift has provided the university with some additional, and more advanced, teaching laboratories than it had previously. In 2005, the university expanded the Colachis Plaza from the Immaculata along Marian Way to the east end of Hall, which effectively closed the east end of the campus to vehicular traffic. That same year, the student body approved plans for a renovation and expansion of the Hahn University Center which began at the end of 2007. The new Student Life Pavilion (SLP) opened in 2009 and hosts the university's new student dining area(s), offices for student organizations and event spaces. The Hahn University Center is now home to administrative offices, meeting and event spaces, and a restaurant and wine bar, La Gran Terazza.

In 2022, students began taking classes at the new Knauss Center for Business Education, a 120,000-square-foot complex that serves as an innovation and collaboration ecosystem for business students.

In the spring of 2022, USD's total enrollment was 9,041 undergraduate, graduate, paralegal and law students from 85 countries and 50 US states.

Environment and location 

Alcalá Park sits atop the edge of a mesa overlooking Mission Bay and  provides stunning panoramic views of San Diego.

The philosophy of USD's founder and her fellow religious relied on the belief that studying in beautiful surroundings could improve the educational experience of students. Thus, the university's buildings are designed in a 16th-century Plateresque architecture, a style of the Spanish Renaissance, paying homage to both San Diego's Catholic heritage and the Universidad de Alcalá in Spain.

The campus is located approximately two miles north of downtown San Diego, on the north crest of Mission Valley in the community of Linda Vista. From the westernmost edges of Alcalá Park the communities of Mission Hills, Old Town, Point Loma, Ocean Beach, Bay Park, Mission Beach and Pacific Beach can be seen. Also, the Pacific Ocean, San Diego Harbor, the Coronado Islands and La Jolla are visible from the campus.

In February 2022, Travel+Leisure named  USD campus as one of the most beautiful college campuses in the United States  and Best Choice Schools ranked it the most beautiful urban campus in the United States.

Administration 
Though a Catholic university, the school is no longer governed directly by the Diocese of San Diego. Today, a lay board of trustees governs the university's operations. However, the Bishop of San Diego, Robert W. McElroy, retains a seat as a permanent member and retains control of the school's designation of "Catholic."

Academics 

USD offers more than 80 degrees at the bachelor's, master's, and doctoral levels. Students choose from undergraduate and graduate degree programs from the seven schools and college that comprise the University of San Diego:

 College of Arts and Sciences
 Knauss School of Business
 Shiley-Marcos School of Engineering
 Hahn School of Nursing and Health Science
 Joan B. Kroc School of Peace Studies
 School of Law
 School of Leadership and Education Sciences
The College of Arts and Sciences and the School of Law are the oldest academic divisions at USD; the Joan B. Kroc School of Peace Studies is the university's newest school. USD offers an honors program at the undergraduate level, with approximately 300 students enrolled annually.

 Undergraduate Programs: 43 bachelor's degrees with many concentrations; 56 minors
 Graduate Programs: 36 master's degrees, Juris Doctor (JD), five LLM degrees, four doctorates, dual degree programs
USD has a Carnegie Classification of R2- Doctoral University: High Research Activity. Carnegie gives this ranking to “institutions that awarded at least 20 research/scholarship doctoral degrees and had at least $5 million in total research expenditures (as reported through the National Science Foundation (NSF) Higher Education Research & Development Survey (HERD)).”

The School of business was recently renamed to Knauss School of Business after Don Knauss announced to increase the  philanthropic giving to the university to $50 million as an investment in educating ethical and compassionate business leaders

Rankings 

USD is the youngest independent institution on the U.S. News & World Report list of top 100 universities in the United States. In 2021, University of San Diego was ranked tied for 88th in the "National Universities". U.S. News & World Report also ranked the University of San Diego's undergraduate Engineering program tied for 13th in the U.S. for engineering schools where doctorates are not offered  and the #1 Catholic Graduate Nursing School in the nation.

The Knauss School of Business was ranked the second-highest undergraduate business school in California, according to the 2022 ranking from Poets & Quants for undergraduate business schools. The School of Business has ranked No. 1 in the nation for two years in a row on College Factual’s ranking of Best Real Estate Colleges in the United States and No. 13 of Best Communications Schools in the United States.

In February 2022, Travel+Leisure named USD campus as one of the most beautiful college campuses in the United States. In 2021, The Princeton Review ranked the University of San Diego 6th in Most Beautiful Campus, 8th in Best Quality of life, 14th in Most Popular Study Abroad Program, and 18th in Green Colleges.

In 2014, University of San Diego was ranked the 482nd top college in the United States by Payscale and CollegeNet's Social Mobility Index college rankings. 18% of students are pell-grant eligible.

In 2013, QS Global 200 Business Schools Report ranked USD's MBA program 59th in North America.

Athletics 

The Toreros compete in NCAA Division I Football Championship Subdivision (FCS) of the National Collegiate Athletic Association (NCAA) and are members of the West Coast Conference for most sports.

Facilities 
Athletic facilities for the school include:

 Jenny Craig Pavilion
 Torero Stadium
 Fowler Park and Cunningham Field
 Skip and Cindy Hogan Tennis Center
 USD Sports Center Pool
 USD Softball Complex
 McNamara Fitness Room
 Varsity Weight Room
 Practice/Recreation Facilities
 Erg Room
 USD Boat House

USD has hosted NCAA Tournament events in men's and women's soccer, as well as men's and women's tennis. Additionally, between 2001-2003, the Jenny Craig Pavilion played host to the West Coast Conference Basketball Championships, as well as in 2008. Torero stadium has also played host to the 2012 Women's Soccer College Cup.

Notable alumni 

Sattam bin Abdulaziz Al Saud, 1965 (BA), and an honorary doctorate from USD in 1975; one of senior members of House of Saud; son of King Abdulaziz; 12th governor of Riyadh Province, Saudi Arabia
Carlos Bustamante, 1969 (BA), Mayor of Tijuana
George Coker, 1976 (BA), retired United States Navy commander awarded the Navy Cross for extraordinary heroism as a prisoner of war during the Vietnam War
Salvatore Cordileone, 1978 (JCD), Canon Law. Archbishop of San Francisco
Eric Musselman, 1987 (BA), American basketball coach; current head coach at the University of Arkansas, and former head coach for the University of Nevada, Reno, Sacramento Kings and Golden State Warriors
Lowell McAdam, 1983 (MBA), Chairman and CEO of Verizon Communications, a company he joined in 2000
Juan Vargas, 1983 (BA), U.S. Representative for California's 51st congressional district
Lorenzo Fertitta, 1991 (BBA), entrepreneur, casino executive and sports promoter (MMA)
Andrew Firestone, 1998 (BBA), television personality and businessman
Monte Brem, 2000 (JD & MBA), founder and CEO of StepStone Group, private equity firm
Ryan Zinke, 2003 (MS), former United States Secretary of the Interior
Jonny Kim, 2013 (BA), U.S. Navy physician, Navy Seal, and Astronaut
Todd Gloria, 2000 (BA), former California State Assembly Member and current Mayor of San Diego
John “Jocko” Willink, author, podcaster, and retired United States Navy officer who served in the Navy SEALs 
Riley Adams, Major League Baseball player for the Washington Nationals
Alison Armitage, former swimmer, actress and Playboy Playmate
Paul Sewald, Major League Baseball player for the Seattle Mariners
Robert Kardashian, lawyer for O. J. Simpson and father of reality show personalities

Notes

References

Further reading
 Boudoin. Burt J. (2001). Fortress on the Hill: Founding the University of San Diego and the San Diego College for Women, 1942-1963 Mission Hills, CA: Saint Francis Historical Society,

External links 

 
 University of San Diego athletics website
 

 
University of San Diego
Catholic universities and colleges in California
 
Association of Catholic Colleges and Universities
Peace and conflict studies
Schools accredited by the Western Association of Schools and Colleges
1949 establishments in California
Educational institutions established in 1949
Mission Valley, San Diego